The 1967 Tour de France was the 54th edition of the Tour de France, one of cycling's Grand Tours. The Tour began in Angers with an individual time trial on 29 June, and Stage 12 occurred on 12 July with a flat stage from Digne. The race finished in Paris on 23 July.

Stage 12
12 July 1967 – Digne to Marseille,

Stage 13
13 July 1967 – Marseille to Carpentras,

Stage 14
14 July 1967 – Carpentras to Sète, 

The peloton granted the stage win to Tom Simpson's teammate, Barry Hoban, after Simpson's death the day before.

Rest day 2
15 July 1967 – Sète

Stage 15
16 July 1967 – Sète to Toulouse,

Stage 16
17 July 1967 – Toulouse to Luchon,

Stage 17
18 July 1967 – Luchon to Pau,

Stage 18
19 July 1967 – Pau to Bordeaux,

Stage 19
20 July 1967 – Bordeaux to Limoges,

Stage 20
21 July 1967 – Limoges to Puy de Dôme,

Stage 21
22 July 1967 – Clermont-Ferrand to Fontainebleau,

Stage 22a
23 July 1967 – Fontainebleau to Versailles,

Stage 22b
23 July 1967 – Versailles to Paris,  (ITT)

References

1967 Tour de France
Tour de France stages